An artistic canon of body proportions (or aesthetic canon of proportion), in the sphere of visual arts, is a formally codified set of criteria deemed mandatory for a particular artistic style of figurative art. The word canon was first used for this type of rule in Classical Greece, where it set a reference standard for body proportions, so as to produce a harmoniously formed figure appropriate to depict gods or kings. Other art styles have similar rules that apply particularly to the representation of royal or divine personalities.

Ancient Egypt

In 1961, Danish Egyptologist Erik Iverson described a canon of proportions in classical Egyptian painting. This work was based on still-detectable grid lines on tomb paintings: he determined that the grid was 18 cells high, with the base-line at the soles of the feet and the top of the grid aligned with hair line, and the navel at the eleventh line. These 'cells' were specified according to the size of the subject's fist, measured across the knuckles.  (Iverson attempted to find a fixed (rather than relative) size for the grid, but this aspect of his work has been dismissed by later analysts.) This proportion was already established by the Narmer Palette from about the 31st century BCE, and remained in use until at least the conquest by Alexander the Great some 3,000 years later.

The Egyptian canon for paintings and reliefs specified that heads should be shown in profile, that shoulders and chest be shown head-on, that hips and legs be again in profile, and that male figures should have one foot forward and female figures stand with feet together.

Classical Greece

Canon of Polykleitos
In Classical Greece, the sculptor Polykleitos (fifth century BCE) established the Canon of Polykleitos. Though his theoretical treatise is lost to history, he is quoted as saying, "Perfection ... comes about little by little through many numbers". By this he meant that a statue should be composed of clearly definable parts, all related to one another through a system of ideal mathematical proportions and balance. Though the Kanon was probably represented by his Doryphoros, the original bronze statue has not survived, but later marble copies exist.

Canon of Lysippos
The sculptor Lysippos (fourth century BCE) developed a more gracile style. In his , Pliny the Elder wrote that Lysippos introduced a new canon into art:  signifying "a canon of bodily proportions essentially different from that of Polykleitos". Lysippos is credited with having established the 'eight heads high' canon of proportion.

Praxiteles
Praxiteles (fourth century BCE), sculptor of the famed Aphrodite of Knidos, is credited with having thus created a canonical form for the female nude, but neither the original work nor any of its ratios survive. Academic study of later Roman copies (and in particular modern restorations of them) suggest that they are artistically and anatomically inferior to the original.

Classical India

Renaissance Italy

Other such systems of 'ideal proportions' in painting and sculpture include Leonardo da Vinci's Vitruvian Man, based on a record of body proportions made by the architect Vitruvius, in the third book of his series . Rather than setting a canon of ideal body proportions for others to follow, Vitruvius sought to identify the proportions that exist in reality; da Vinci idealised these proportions in the commentary that accompanies his drawing:

Other measurements

Canon of Jōchō
Jōchō (定朝; died 1057 CE), also known as Jōchō Busshi, was a Japanese sculptor of the Heian period. He popularised the yosegi technique of sculpting a single figure out of many pieces of wood, and he redefined the canon of body proportions used in Japan to create Buddhist imagery. He based the measurements on a unit equal to the distance between the sculpted figure's chin and hairline. The distance between each knee (in the seated lotus pose) is equal to the distance from the bottoms of the legs to the hair.

Contemporary (head-based) method
Modern figurative artists tend to use a shorthand of more comprehensive canons, based on proportions relative to the human head. In the system recommended by Andrew Loomis, an idealized human body is eight heads tall, the torso being three heads and the legs another four; a more realistically proportioned body, he claims, is closer to seven-and-a-half heads tall, the difference being in the length of the legs. He additionally recommends head-based proportions for children of varying ages, and as means of producing different effects in adult bodies (e.g. a "heroic" body is nine heads tall).

See also
 
 
 
 Canon (basic principle), a rule or a body of rules or principles generally established as valid and fundamental in a field of art or philosophy

Notes

References

Art history
Aesthetic beauty